The University of the Free State (Sesotho: Yunivesithi ya Freistata) is a multi-campus public university in Bloemfontein, the capital of the Free State and the judicial capital of South Africa. It was first established as an institution of higher learning in 1904 as a tertiary section of Grey College. It was declared an independent Afrikaans-language university in 1950 and the name was changed to the University of the Orange Free State. The university has two satellite campuses. Initially a whites-only precinct, the university was fully de-segregated in 1996. The first black university vice-chancellor was appointed in 2010.

History
The long-held dream of an institution of higher education in the Free State became a reality in 1904 when the Grey College first accepted matriculants for a full B.A. course. In 1906 the tertiary part of Grey College became known as the Grey University College (GUC), but shortly thereafter the school and college parted ways. In 1910, the Parliament of the Orange River Colony passed legislation declaring the GUC an official educational institution in the fields of the Arts and Sciences. In terms of the modern South African university system, the University of the Free State owes its formal emergence to the University of South Africa (UNISA), itself established as an autonomous university by legislation in 1916. UNISA, at the time, was an "umbrella" or federal institution with its seat in Pretoria, playing an academic trusteeship role for several colleges that eventually became autonomous universities. One of the colleges that were under UNISA's trusteeship was Grey University College, Bloemfontein. UNISA's trusteeship ended in 1949 when the Orange Free State University received a charter as a university.

Initially, the medium of instruction was English, but later this changed to be bilingual and included Afrikaans. The name was changed to the University College of the Orange Free State—the Afrikaans version of this name change is the source of the word used to this day to refer to students of the university ("Kovsies"). In the late 1940s, the medium of instruction was changed to Afrikaans. The university was declared a full-fledged, independent university in 1950, and the name was again changed to the University of the Orange Free State.

In 1993, it adopted a system of parallel-medium tuition. However, the university decided to make English the primary medium of instruction in 2016. Subsequent to the adoption in 1999 of a new university statute, the UFS entered a significant growth period. Today, the University of the Free State boasts more students than ever in its history.

In February 2001, the university's name changed to the University of the Free State, which was adopted to reflect the real character of the institution and its environment. In 2004, the university celebrated its centenary.

Language policy
After the defeat of the Boers by the British in 1902 the Orange Free State became known as the Orange River Colony during which time the official language was changed from Dutch to English. Therefore, when the Grey University College was founded in 1904, the language medium was English. However, Dutch was one of the subjects taught at the college from the very beginning. Language activists in favor of Afrikaans made it possible for the language to be accepted as one of the subjects at the college as a "supplementary subject to Dutch" in 1919 when Afrikaans became a popular subject. In 1950 the University of the Orange Free State (UOFS) was established and the official medium language was Afrikaans. The name of the university again changed in 2001 to the University of the Free State as it is known today. Although a bilingual language policy (Afrikaans & English) were introduced since 1993 it was formalized in 2003. However, the university decided to make English the primary medium of instruction in 2016. This decision was jointly challenged by civil rights group AfriForum and Solidarity (South African trade union) but the decision to remove Afrikaans was upheld by the Constitutional Court of South Africa in 2017; when the judgment favored the university's new language policy which has been implemented since then.

Campuses

The university's Bloemfontein Campus is near the city centre. The university also has two satellite campuses. One is situated in Bloemfontein, referred to as South Campus, and the other in the former homeland QwaQwa that was, until 2003, part of the University of the North.

The university sports facilities cater for more than 20 sports, medical facilities and cultural activities, ranging from the political arena to outdoor life and the creative arts. It has a student centre, a student newspaper, the IRAWA and a campus radio station KovsieFm. In addition, students have access to a library, The Sasol Library, as well as the Frik Scott medical library, a career and guidance centre, a student theatre and a computer centre.

Academic divisions
 Economic and Management Sciences
 Education
 Health Sciences
 Law
 Natural and Agricultural Sciences
 The Humanities
 Theology and Religion
 University of the Free State Business School

Notable alumni
Main List: Notable Alumni of the University of the Free State
 Bram Fischer (1908–1975): Grandson of Abraham Fischer, lawyer, and notable anti-apartheid activist, including legal defence of anti-apartheid figures, such as Nelson Mandela
 C. R. Swart (1894–1982): First State President of the Republic of South Africa 1961–1967
 P. W. Botha (1916–2006): Prime Minister of South Africa from 1978 to 1984 and the first executive state president from 1984 to 1989
 Hansie Cronje (1969–2002): South African cricketer and captain of the South African national cricket team in the 1990s
 Rassie Erasmus (1972–): International rugby player, Springbok coach 
 Neil Powell (1978–): Coach of South Africa national rugby sevens team, 2016 Olympic Bronze medalist team coach
 Leon Schuster (1951–): South African filmmaker, comedian, actor, presenter, and singer
 Colin Ingram (1985–): Cricketer and member of the South African national cricket team
 Susan Vosloo (1957–): South Africa's first female cardiothoracic surgeon
 Rolene Strauss (1992–): Miss World 2014
 Wayde van Niekerk (1992–): 400m world and Olympic record holder
 Mahube Molemela (1963–): First female judge president of the Free State Division of the High Court of South Africa
 Antjie Krog (1952–): Award-winning poet
 Heinrich Brüssow (1986–): Springbok rugby player
 Pauline Gutter (1980–): Award-winning visual artist
 Deon Meyer (1958–): World-renowned novelist
 Karel Schoeman (1939–2017): Historian, translator, and author
 Winkie Direko (1929–2012):  Premier of the Free State 1999–2004
 Elzabe Rockman (1967–): Member of the Executive Council for Finance 2013–2019
 Maye Musk (1948–): Model and dietitian

Notable staff
 :Category:Academic staff of the University of the Free State

Ranking

In 2010 Webometrics ranked the university the ninth best in South Africa and 2095th in the world.

Racial integration, de-segregation, and controversy 
After having previously been open only to whites, UFS admitted its first black students in the early 1990s, as apartheid in South Africa began to end. Large majorities of students of all races supported racial integration of the housing facilities, and for several years UFS was seen as a model integration project.  However, in the mid- to late-1990s, blacks began to form a larger percentage of the student body (they are 85% of the population of the Free State province) and began to be less enthusiastic about continuing traditions from the white-only history of UFS. After a 1996 riot, the UFS student residences became de facto re-segregated.  Furthermore, as classes became offered in English as well as Afrikaans, classes also became segregated as whites favoured Afrikaans-language classes and blacks favoured English-language classes.

The university faced controversy in late February 2008 following a video made by four white students of the Reitz residence which was referred to as being a protest against racial integration on the campus. The real motive behind the making of the video is still debatable. The video depicted five black workers being subjected to various mock activities, including being forced to consume food which appeared to have been urinated on. The video received coverage from both South African and international media and condemnation from most major political parties in South Africa, and led to riots and racial strife among students at the university. In riots that followed the video, threats were made against white students by protesting black students.

The council of the university closed the Reitz hostel over the incident and the incident triggered a broader investigation into racism in education by the Department of Education of South Africa.

The then-new Vice-Chancellor, Jonathan Jansen – a strong proponent of intellectual freedom and the first black president of UFS – was appointed and he has subsequently initiated a process for campus-wide racial integration among students which included inviting the four students to continue with their studies at the university. In 2010 The university was awarded the World Universities Forum Award for Best Practice in Higher Education which praised amongst other the racial integration and harmonisation of the student community.
On receiving her honorary doctorate from the university, Oprah Winfrey called the transformation of the university as "nothing short of a miracle" when referring to the incident and subsequent racial integration.

In April 2015, the University of the Free State, under leadership of UFS Rector and Vice-Chancellor, Prof. Jonathan Jansen, led a three-day discussion session about the role and place of statues, symbols, and signs at the university which initiated the process to remove the statues of C. R. Swart and Martinus Theunis Steyn. In 2016 following protests during the FeesMustFall movement; the statue of C. R. Swart was vandalized by Economic Freedom Fighters protesters. C. R. Swart served as the Governor General of South Africa from 1960 - 1961 where after he became the president of the Republic of South Africa from 1961 until 1967. Being a symbol of importance to the Afrikaners, the statue was removed from campus by the Voortrekkers movement on the 19th of December 2016 where after it was restored and relocated to the Sarel Cilliers heritage site.

In 2018, the university targeted the statue of President MT Steyn, the last Boer president of the Orange Free State, as a priority to be dealt with according to its Integrated Transformation Plan (ITP). In November, the Rector and Vice-Chancellor, Prof Francis Petersen, stated that a large portion of the student body felt unwelcome near the statue and that a “Special Task Team” found that there could be no historical reinterpretation of the statue and that it should therefore be relocated.

See also
 Open access in South Africa and List of South African open access repositories

References

External links

 
 Jonathan Jansen, Vice-Chancellor and Rector of the University of the Free State, interviewed on Conversations from Penn State

 
1904 establishments in South Africa
Educational institutions established in 1904
Public universities in South Africa
Universities in the Free State (province)